PGA Tour Golf 486 is a video game developed by American studio Hitmen Productions and published by Electronic Arts for DOS.

Gameplay
PGA Tour Golf 486 features digitized backgrounds and animations, PGA tour statistics for players, and four ways of playing.

Reception

Next Generation reviewed the game, rating it two stars out of five, stated that "The near continual access delays from both the CD-ROM and unnecessary user prompts, along with a frustrating targeting system, will keep all but the most die-hard golfers from ever being entertained."

Reviews
PC Gamer (Dec, 1994)
Computer Gaming World (Jan, 1995)
PC Games - Oct, 1994
PC Player - Oct, 1994
MikroBitti - Dec, 1994
ASM (Aktueller Software Markt) - Dec, 1994

References

1994 video games
DOS games
DOS-only games
Electronic Arts games
Golf video games
Hitmen Productions games
Video games developed in the United States